USCGC Cape Small was United States Coast Guard steel-hulled patrol boat of the 95-Foot or Cape class. She was stationed in Hilo, Hawaii from 1953 to 1987 where she assisted in law enforcement as well as search and rescue operations. In December 1968, she assisted with the search and eventually rescued the pilot of a Piper Cherokee that ditched in the ocean 9 miles North of Hawaii's big island.

References

 

Small
Ships built by the United States Coast Guard Yard
1953 ships